John Charles Lynn (born January 12, 2000) is an American professional soccer player who plays as a forward for Orlando City of Major League Soccer.

Early years 
Growing up in St. Louis, Missouri, Lynn prepped at Chaminade College Preparatory where he was a member of the National Honor Society and winner of the Chaminade College Preparatory Academic Scholarship. He played club soccer for St. Louis Scott Gallagher SC of the U.S. Soccer Development Academy from 2013, graduating to the Saint Louis FC academy team in 2017.

Notre Dame Fighting Irish 
Lynn played four seasons of college soccer at the University of Notre Dame for the Fighting Irish between 2018 and 2021. As a freshman he appeared in all 21 matches including three starts, scoring three goals. He most notably scored the overtime game-winner against Virginia Cavaliers to send Notre Dame to the 2018 NCAA College Cup quarterfinals. Lynn led the Irish in goals in each of the next three seasons including a perfect six for six on penalties during his college career. In 2021, Notre Dame won the ACC Men's Soccer Tournament for the first time in team history. Individually, Lynn was a First Team All-ACC selection in the 2020 and 2021 seasons and 2021 United Soccer Coaches Second Team All-American.

Club career

Saint Louis FC
On July 7, 2018, Lynn was named to a senior matchday squad for the first time as an unused substitute for Saint Louis FC in a USL Championship match against Las Vegas Lights FC.

Orlando City 
On January 11, 2022, Lynn was selected in the first round (18th overall) of the 2022 MLS SuperDraft by Orlando City. He made his professional debut with the team's reserve affiliate, Orlando City B, in MLS Next Pro on March 26, 2022, and scored both goals in a 2–0 win over Chicago Fire FC II. He made his MLS debut for Orlando City on April 24, 2022, as an 88th-minute substitute in a 3–0 defeat to New York Red Bulls. On May 21, he scored his first career hattrick as part of a 6–0 win over Inter Miami CF II. In total, Lynn made 18 appearances for Orlando City B during the 2022 MLS Next Pro season, ranked third in the league for goals with 15 and was named to the MLS Next Pro Best XI.

On September 16, 2022, Lynn joined USL Championship leaders San Antonio FC on loan for the remainder of the 2022 season.

Personal life 
Lynn's father, John, played soccer at Saint Louis University from 1988 to 1991.

Career statistics

College

Club

Honors 
Notre Dame Fighting Irish
ACC Men's Soccer Tournament: 2021

Orlando City
U.S. Open Cup: 2022

Individual
MLS Next Pro Best XI: 2022

References

External links 
 Jack Lynn at Notre Dame Fighting Irish
 Jack Lynn at Orlando City SC
 

2000 births
Living people
Soccer players from St. Louis
American soccer players
Association football forwards
Notre Dame Fighting Irish men's soccer players
Orlando City SC draft picks
Orlando City SC players
Orlando City B players
MLS Next Pro players
Major League Soccer players
Saint Louis FC players
San Antonio FC players